Francisco Aldo Barreto Miranda (born 1 March 1981), known as Aldo Barreto, is a Paraguayan football midfielder who currently plays for Club 30 Unidos in the Liga Minguera in the Alto Paraná. He was the leading goal scorer of the 2009/2010 season with a small team, Bontang FC, he scored nineteen goals in thirty-one appearances. Then he moved to another East Kalimantan club, Persiba Balikpapan.

Career
Barreto began his career in Cerro Porteño PF before transferring to Club Guaraní of Asunción.

Persikabo Bogor
He joined Persikabo in the Indonesia Second Division on 14 March 2014.

See also
List of Indonesian football competitions all-time top scorers
2011 Indonesia Super League All-Star Game
2011–12 Indonesia Super League goalscorers
2012 Indonesia Super League All-Star team

Honours

Club honors
Persisam Putra Samarinda
Premier Division (1): 2008–09

Individual honors
Premier Division Best player : 2008–09
Indonesia Super League Top Scorer (1): 2009–10

Notes

References

External links
 
 Profile at Liga Indonesia 
 Aldo Barreto at Specs-sports.com
 

1981 births
Living people
Paraguayan footballers
Paraguayan expatriate sportspeople in Indonesia
Paraguayan expatriate footballers
Paraguayan Primera División players
Cerro Porteño players
Club Guaraní players
Sportivo Luqueño players
Cerro Corá footballers
Cerro Porteño (Presidente Franco) footballers
Expatriate footballers in Uruguay
Huracán Buceo players
Expatriate footballers in Thailand
Aldo Barreto
Aldo Barreto
Expatriate footballers in Indonesia
Indonesian Premier Division players
PSM Makassar players
Persisam Putra Samarinda players
Liga 1 (Indonesia) players
Bontang F.C. players
Persikabo Bogor players
Persiba Balikpapan players
Association football forwards